The Freedom to Display the American Flag Act of 2005 is an Act of Congress that prohibits condominium associations and real estate management organizations from restricting homeowners from displaying the flag of the United States on their property.

Legislative history
The bill was introduced into the 109th Congress on January 4, 2005.  It was sponsored by Roscoe Bartlett and 13 other members of the House of Representatives.

 June 27, 2006: The bill was passed in the House of Representatives by voice vote. 
 July 17, 2006: The bill passed by unanimous consent in the Senate.
 July 24, 2006: President George W. Bush signed the bill into law.

See also
Jupiter, Florida#United States flag incident

References

Acts of the 109th United States Congress
Flags of the United States